Bihastina viridata is a moth in the family Geometridae first described by William Warren in 1906. It is found in Papua New Guinea.

References

Moths described in 1906
Asthenini
Moths of New Guinea